Jordan Kahu (born 28 January 1991) is a former professional rugby league footballer who last played as a  and er for the Brisbane Broncos in the NRL and New Zealand at international level.

Kahu has played for the Brisbane Broncos and the North Queensland Cowboys in the NRL, as well as the World All Stars & New Zealand Māori in the "All Star" representative stage.

Background
Born in Lower Hutt, New Zealand, Kahu is of Māori descent specifically the Ngāti Toa Iwi (tribe). Kahu is short for Jordan's birth surname Kahukuranui. Kahu attended Wellington College and played his junior rugby union for the Petone Rugby Club with Lima Sopoaga before moving to Australia to attend Keebra Park State High School. While at Keebra Park, Kahu captained the school's rugby league side to win the 2009 Arrive Alive Cup. Kahu played for the Broncos NYC team in 2010 and 2011, scoring 11 tries and kicking 2 goals in 23 games. Kahu's 2011 and 2012 seasons were shattered by two season ending knee injuries.

Playing career

2013
In Round 4 of the 2013 NRL season, Kahu made his NRL debut for the Brisbane Broncos against the Melbourne Storm at centre in the 32–26 loss at Suncorp Stadium. In the Round 9 match against the Parramatta Eels, Kahu scored his first and second NRL tries in the Broncos 19–18 loss at Parramatta Stadium. Soon after, Kahu extended his contract with the Broncos for 2 years, keeping him at the club until the end of the 2015 season. He scored 4 tries from 10 appearances in his debut year.

2014
Kahu injured his knee again for a third time in four years in a trial match against the North Queensland Cowboys. In Round 19 against the New Zealand Warriors, Kahu played his first match for the Broncos of the 2014 season playing on the wing for the suspended Daniel Vidot and scoring a try in the 28–22 win. He finished off the season playing in 3 matches and scoring three tries.

2015
Due to the injury of incumbent fullback Darius Boyd during the off-season, Kahu was selected to fill in at  showing promising performances in the early rounds. During a "breakout season", Kahu was rewarded with a 2-year contract extension with Broncos, to the end of the 2017 season. On 4 October, Kahu played on the wing in the Broncos' 17-16 golden point extra time loss to the North Queensland Cowboys in the 2015 NRL Grand Final. He finished off the 2015 season having played in 22 matches, scoring 9 tries and kicking 22 goals. On 9 October, he was selected in the 23-man New Zealand squad to tour England. Kahu was one of four members of Brisbane's Grand Final team to be included in coach Stephen Kearney's squad for the Three-Test tour and one of six rookies to have received an international call-up by the Kiwis. On 2 November, he made his New Zealand international debut against England, playing at centre in the Kiwis' 26–12 loss at KC Stadium. 

On 14 November, in the third and final test match against England, he scored his first international try for New Zealand in the Kiwis' 20–14 loss at DW Stadium.

2016
On 13 February, Kahu played for the World All Stars against the Indigenous All Stars, playing at fullback in his team's 12–8 win at Suncorp Stadium. In the Round 1 season opening match against the Parramatta Eels, he scored the first try of the 2016 season in the Broncos' 17–4 win at Parramatta Stadium. On 6 May, Kahu played for New Zealand against Australia in the 2016 Anzac Test, playing at fullback in the 16–0 loss at Hunter Stadium. Kahu finished the 2016 NRL season with him playing in 20 matches, scoring 15 tries and kicking 42 goals for the Broncos. On 21 September 2016, Kahu was added to the New Zealand national rugby league team train-on squad for the 2016 Four Nations. On 3 October 2016, Kahu was selected in the final 24-man squad. Kahu played in 4 matches of tournament including starting at fullback and scoring 2 tries in the Kiwis 34-8 Four Nations Final loss against Australia at Anfield.

2017
In February 2017, Kahu was selected in the Broncos 2017 NRL Auckland Nines squad. In Round 1 season opening match against the Cronulla-Sutherland Sharks, Kahu put his name in the record books by scoring the first try of the 2017 season in the Broncos 26–18 win at Shark Park, Kahu is the first player to score the first try of the season in two consecutive seasons. On 5 May 2017, Kahu played for New Zealand in the 2017 ANZAC Test against Australia where he started at centre and kicked 2 goals in the 30–12 loss at Canberra Stadium. On 5 August 2017, Kahu extended his contract with the Broncos to the end of the 2020 season. Kahu finished the 2017 NRL season with him playing in 25 matches, scoring 8 tries and kicking 75 goals for the Broncos. Kahu was in the frame to be selected in the Kiwis 2017 Rugby League World Cup squad but opted to sit out the tournament to recover from a groin injury.

2018
In Round 2 of the 2018 NRL season, Kahu fractured his jaw in the Broncos' win over the North Queensland Cowboys. He returned 10 weeks later in the Broncos' Round 12 win over the Parramatta Eels. He finished the 2018 season with 15 games, two tries, seven goals and 22 points, his lowest tally in all categories since 2015.

2019
On 15 February, Kahu represented the Māori All Stars side, kicking a goal in the 14–34 loss to the Indigenous All Stars. On 18 February, Kahu joined the North Queensland Cowboys on a one-year deal.

In Round 1 of the 2019 NRL season, he made his debut for the Cowboys, starting at fullback in their 24–12 win over the St George Illawarra Dragons. In Round 17, he fractured his eye socket in the Cowboys' 15–12 win over the Sydney Roosters, missing five weeks. He returned in Round 22, playing the final four games of the season. He ended the 2019 season as the Cowboys' top point scorer, with 86 points in 19 games.

On 13 September, it was announced that he would be leaving the Cowboys at the end of the season. With clauses in his previous contract with the Broncos still standing, Kahu returned to the Broncos for the 2019-2020 pre-season.

2020
Hampered by the injuries and indifferent form of their available centres and wingers, Kahu made only two appearances for Brisbane in the 2020 NRL season, a year in which the club finished last on the table for the first time in their history.

2021

Kahu retired at the end of the 2021 NRL season.

Statistics

NRL
 Statistics are correct to the end of the 2019 season

References

External links
North Queensland Cowboys profile

1991 births
Living people
Brisbane Broncos players
New Zealand Māori rugby league players
New Zealand national rugby league team players
New Zealand rugby league players
North Queensland Cowboys players
NRL All Stars players
People educated at Keebra Park State High School
Rugby league centres
Rugby league fullbacks
Rugby league players from Lower Hutt
Rugby league wingers
Wynnum Manly Seagulls players